Gonçalo Faria Costa (born 18 February 2000) is a Portuguese professional footballer who plays as a left-back for Portimonense.

Professional career
Costa is a youth product of the academy of Os Amarelos and Sporting CP. He worked his way up Sporting's youth teams, before joining their U23 side in 2021. On 22 June 2022, he transferred to Portimonense for the 2022-23 season.

He made his professional and Primeira Liga debut with Portimonense as a starter in a 4–0 loss against his childhood club Sporting CP on 10 September 2022.

International career
Costa is a youth international for Portugal, having played up to the Portugal U17s.

References

External links
 
 

2000 births
Living people
Sportspeople from Setúbal
Portuguese footballers
Portugal youth international footballers
Portuguese people of Cape Verdean descent
Association football fullbacks
Sporting CP B players
Portimonense S.C. players
Primeira Liga players
Campeonato de Portugal (league) players